Splendrillia carolae is a species of sea snail, a marine gastropod mollusk in the family Drilliidae.

Description
The length of the shell attains 5.6 mm. the base of the shell is an off-white that gradually gets tannish brown as the shell goes up. Splendrillia Carolae's shell is in a spiral shape.

Distribution
This marine species occurs off the southern tip of New Caledonia.

References

 Wells, Fred E. "A revision of the drilliid genera Splendrillia and Plagiostropha (Gastropoda: Conoidea) from New Caledonia, with additional records from other areas." Mémoires du Muséum national d'histoire naturelle 167 (1995): 527–556.

External links
  Tucker, J.K. 2004 Catalog of recent and fossil turrids (Mollusca: Gastropoda). Zootaxa 682:1-1295.
 Holotype at MNHN, Paris

carolae
Gastropods described in 1995